Steve Kirby may refer to:

Steve T. Kirby (born 1952), 35th Lieutenant Governor of South Dakota
Steve Kirby (musician) (born 1956), American jazz musician
Steven Kirby (born 1977), English cricketer
Steve Kirby (Washington politician) (born 1951), member of the Washington House of Representatives